La Aurora may refer to:

La Aurora de Chile, the first periodical in Chilean history
 La Aurora International Airport, the main airport in Guatemala City, Guatemala
 La Aurora Zoo, a zoo in Guatemala City
 La Aurora station, a Metrocable station in Medellín, Colombia

See also
 Aurora (disambiguation)